Zonites embolium is a species of air-breathing land snail, a terrestrial pulmonate gastropod mollusk in the family Zonitidae.

The subspecies Zonites embolium elevatus Riedel & Mylonas, 1997, that was endemic to Dodecanese Islands, is considered to be extinct.

Distribution
Greece

References

External links
 http://www.animalbase.uni-goettingen.de/zooweb/servlet/AnimalBase/home/species?id=1401

Zonites
Gastropods described in 1936